Thomas Jackson Denson (January 20, 1863 – September 14, 1935) was a notable Alabama musician and singing school teacher within the Sacred Harp tradition. He was the youngest of the four sons of the Levi Phillip Denson, a farmer, a gold miner in Arbacoochee, Cleburne County and a Methodist minister, and Julia Ann Jones Denson. Thomas J. Denson was born in 1863 in Arbacoochee and named after Stonewall Jackson. He was married to Amanda Burdette, a music and literary teacher, a singer, and song composer, until her death in 1910; she was the younger sister of Sidney Burdette, his brother's wife. They had five children: two sons, Paine W. Denson and William Howard Denson; and three daughters, Anna Eugenia Denson, Maggie Francis Denson, and Jarusha (Aunt Rush/Ruth) Henrietta Denson. In 1914, he married Lola Mahalia Akers, with whom he had three daughters: Violet Denson Hinton, Vera Denson Nunn, and Tommye Mahalia Denson Mauldin.

Along with his brother Seaborn McDaniel Denson, Thomas Denson formed the Sacred Harp Publishing Co. In 1933 they purchased the rights to the 1911 J. S. James Sacred Harp and began a revision of it. This revision, known as the Original Sacred Harp (Denson Revision), was published in 1936.

Thomas J. Denson was a popular singing school professor and taught singing schools from Georgia to Texas. Some claim that he taught more Sacred Harp singers than any other man. He was affectionately known to many as "Uncle Tom." When he died suddenly in a community near Jasper, Alabama, he was preparing to go to a singing. Mrs. Edwards wrote in the hymnal: "Birmingham news reporters estimated a crowd of 15,000 people in attendance" at Fairview Cemetery in Double Springs.

A granite monument to the memory of Thomas J. and Seaborn M. Denson was erected on the courthouse square in Double Springs, Alabama. This was done in 1944, the centennial year of the Sacred Harp. Part of the inscription reads, "By the loving hands of their families, pupils of their singing schools, and legions of singers and friends."

Thomas J. Denson died September 14, 1935. His brother Seaborn died in 1936, and Tom's son, Paine Denson worked with his sister Ruth Denson Edwards and other members of the revision committee to see the "Denson" edition of the Sacred Harp through to completion.

A. M. Cagle worked for Denson early in his life, and took lessons with the elder musician as well; Denson would go on to become Cagle's brother-in-law for a brief time.

References

Reverend Levi Phillips Denson (1819-1889): Denson families in America, ed. Dr. M.E. (Eddie) Denson (Paducah, Ky.: Turner Publishing, 1997). This source provides most of the genealogical information.
Ruth Denson Edwards, "Music" foreword, Original Sacred Harp (Denson Revision 1844-1977) (Cullman, Ala.: Sacred Harp Publishing, 1977). This tunebook contains sections dealing with both family members' contributions and the accomplishments of the Densons.

1863 births
1935 deaths
Sacred Harp
Musicians from Alabama
People from Cleburne County, Alabama
People from Winston County, Alabama
19th-century American composers
20th-century American composers
American male composers
American hymnwriters
20th-century American male musicians
19th-century American male musicians